Colentina may refer to:
 Colentina (river), a tributary of the river Dâmboviţa in Bucharest
 Colentina, Bucharest, a neighborhood
 Colentina Hospital, Bucharest